Flintdale is an unincorporated place and railway point in geographic Selwyn Township in Unorganized North Cochrane District in northeastern Ontario, Canada.

It is on the Flint River, part of the James Bay drainage basin, which flows via the Kenogami River and Albany River to James Bay.

References

Communities in Cochrane District